Monaghan was a parliamentary constituency represented in Dáil Éireann, the lower house of the Irish parliament or Oireachtas from 1921 to 1977. The constituency elected 3 deputies (Teachtaí Dála, commonly known as TDs) to the Dáil, on the system of proportional representation by means of the single transferable vote (PR-STV).

History 
The constituency was created in 1921 as a 3-seat constituency, under the Government of Ireland Act 1920, for the 1921 election to the House of Commons of Southern Ireland, whose members formed the 2nd Dáil.

It succeeded the constituencies of Monaghan North and Monaghan South which were used to elect the Members of the 1st Dáil and earlier British House of Commons members.

It was abolished under the Electoral (Amendment) Act 1974, when it was replaced by the new constituency of Cavan–Monaghan which was first used at the 1977 general election.

Boundaries 
The constituency spanned the entire area of the County Monaghan.

TDs

Elections

1973 by-election 
Following the election of Fianna Fáil TD Erskine H. Childers as President of Ireland, a by-election was held on 27 November 1973. The seat was won by the Fine Gael candidate Brendan Toal.

1973 general election

1969 general election

1965 general election

1961 general election

1957 general election

1954 general election

1951 general election

1948 general election

1944 general election

1943 general election

1938 general election

1937 general election

1933 general election

1932 general election

September 1927 general election

June 1927 general election

1923 general election

1922 general election

1921 general election 

|}

See also 
Dáil constituencies
Politics of the Republic of Ireland
Historic Dáil constituencies
Elections in the Republic of Ireland

References

External links
Oireachtas Members Database

Historic constituencies in County Monaghan
Dáil constituencies in the Republic of Ireland (historic)
1921 establishments in Ireland
1977 disestablishments in Ireland
Constituencies established in 1921
Constituencies disestablished in 1977